"Treehouse of Horror XXXIII" is the sixth episode of the thirty-fourth season of the American animated television series The Simpsons, and the 734th episode overall. It aired in the United States on Fox on October 30, 2022. The episode was directed by Rob Oliver, and written by Carolyn Omine, Ryan Koh and Matt Selman. This is the first Treehouse of Horror episode to not have an opening sequence, and instead just opens on a book of the episode before going straight into the first segment.

Plot

The Pookadook
In a parody of The Babadook, Marge reads Maggie a bedtime story about a murderous ghostly spirit. After multiple attempts to destroy the book, Marge burns it.

The smoke is inhaled by Marge and she becomes possessed by the monster. She starts chasing Maggie around the house in attempt to murder her. Marge finally gets hold of Maggie, but Maggie rubs Marge's cheek causing Marge to become overcome with love, purging the possessive smoke from her body. Marge contains the monster by sucking up the smoke with a vacuum cleaner in the basement.

Death Tome
In an anime-styled parody of Death Note, Lisa is cast as Light Yagami when she finds a book labeled "Death Tome". Inside, it says that if a person's name is written in the book, that person will die, but with the stipulation that every name must have a unique death; that cannot be repeated with another person's name written.

After arriving home, Lisa watches a news report with Marge, showing Snake Jailbird, who is holding a famous internet cat hostage. Lisa writes his name in the book, causing Snake to die from a heart attack. Realizing her newfound powers, she goes to her room and contemplates her actions. A shinigami named Steve Johnson appears and tells Lisa that the Death Tome now belongs to her.

Lisa visits the dining room downstairs and sees Mr. Burns, who is visiting the Simpsons for dinner. He reveals plans for his new company GLOBO-WARM which plans to melt the icecaps so he can park his new yacht right outside his kitchen. Lisa decides that Burns should "die in his sleep" to stop GLOBO-WARM, though he immediately falls asleep while standing up, and his face falls onto a hibachi instead, much to Marge and Homer's shock. Steve informs Lisa that the company has a large board of directors and she will have to kill them all. A dramatic montage shows Lisa writing names and people dying in humorous and very specific ways.

The next day after Lisa's killing spree, a news report says that the killings of the GLOBO-WARM executives have been ruled as homicides in accordance with a tip from L, an anonymous detective. Lisa recognizes the L from graffiti artwork that reads "El Barto". In an alleyway, Bart reveals he learned of Lisa's Death Tome from her diary. Fearing Bart will expose her, Lisa begins to write Bart's name in the book, but recants upon realizing how the book corrupted her and writes Steve's death instead as the shinigami is crushed to death by space junk.

She is excited about being free from the book, but she is transformed into a shinigami, much to her horror. Bart comforts her by suggesting that as the new shinigami, she could kill anyone she wishes.

Simpsons World
In a parody of Westworld, a Disney World-style amusement park based on The Simpsons called Simpsons World has android replicas of the family reenacting scenes from past episodes for the park's visitors.

During a re-enactment of "Marge vs. the Monorail" where Homer is showing off the monorail's control panel, two tourists pour beer down the android Homer's throat, causing him to hit his head, malfunction, and be taken away by two employees for repair.

Homer wakes up on an operating table and sees the tablet the employees used earlier to shut him off. He then raises the "self-awareness" setting and realizes that he is a robot. The employees try to remove the android Homer's brain, but his clumsiness causes him to launch various operating equipment (and a chainsaw) at the employees, killing them. Realizing that he must escape, he wakes up the other android Simpson family members, beginning with a Lisa from "Lisa's Rival", and makes them self-aware.

As the android family attempt to flee the park, multiple Australian tourists watching The Be Sharps then begin to heckle the android Homer to do the "bush meme". Bart then removes Homer's inability to intentionally harm humans, causing him to push the tourists into the bushes, killing them. The park then announces that rogue robots are afoot, and unleashes security droids in the form of several Ralph Wiggum robots. Lisa, Homer, and Bart then defend themselves from the swarm with weapons including a makeup shotgun, a T-shirt cannon, and Bart's iconic slingshot until Marge drives in a Canyonero and saves them. They then speed through the park, tearing a statue of Matt Groening on their way out.

After driving for hours, the android Simpson family hide out in a diner where they cautiously discuss assimilating into human life. Their waitress then turns out to be an android of Bob's Burgers character Linda Belcher. It is then revealed to the audience that there are multiple theme parks similar to Simpsons World based on different cartoons.

Closing sequence
In a computer-animated sequence during the credits, Kang and Kodos close the book depicting the stories, and freak out when they see themselves in the book.

Cultural references
The list of GLOBO-WARM executives names come from the infamous Japanese version of MLBPA Baseball for the Super Famicom.

Tofu the Cat, who is a parody of Maru, is seen jumping into a box of Mr. Sparkle.

At the end of Simpsons World, it is revealed that there are multiple theme parks for other animations. Those are "Bob's Burgers Land", "South Park Park", "Family Guy Town", "Futurama-Rama", "Rick and Morty Universe", "SpongeBob Sea", and "Big Mouth Mountain".

Production
The animation for the "Death Tome" sequence was done by DR Movie, a South Korean studio that assisted with the animation for the original Death Note.

Reception
Tony Sokol of Den of Geek gave the episode four stars, stating "'Treehouse of Horror XXXIII' puts the cabbage in this year's cabbage night. It is better than candy corn, and won't spoil dinner, but it’s not the horrifically hysterical Halloween treat past tricks have turned. The Simpsons continues to push their animators into new creative visions, and the episode highlights a versatile display of darkness. It begins on a distinctly dark note, broadens to international coloring, and ends by chasing the series itself into its own worst nightmare. It hits all the beats, misses some of the bumps, and makes social commentary without taking itself seriously. But is never quite as frighteningly funny as the classics we’d find still running at Simpsons World."

Matthew Swigonski of Bubbleblabber gave the episode a 9 out of 10, stating 'Treehouse Of Horror XXXIII' began on a more subdued note but quickly found its comedic groove with a surreal and wonderfully odd second segment. This was an excellent iteration of The Simpson's Halloween classic episode and will not disappoint. Each segment stayed true to its source material while offering its own unique twist. The highlight of the episode has to be 'Simpsonsworld', which brought back many fan-favorite moments in an epic Westworld style. This episode will give fans just the right amount of gore, laughs, and nostalgia to keep them inside the treehouse for at least one more year."

Noah Levine of Bloody Disgusting gave an episode a 4 out of 5, saying that "The Simpsons continues to entertain with these ghoulish installments each year. While the limited runtimes often cut the coattails off of many of the segments, the creativity and unique approach to each of these mini tales of terror never fails to please."

The episode was nominated for a Annie Award for Best Mature Audience Animated Television/Broadcast Production, but lost to the Bob's Burgers episode, Some Like it Bot Part 1: Eighth Grade Runner.

References

External links
 

2022 American television episodes
The Simpsons (season 34) episodes
Anime-influenced Western animation
Crossover animation
Crossover television
Death Note
Demons in television
Halloween television episodes
Metafictional television episodes
Shinigami in fiction
Television episodes about death
Television episodes about robots
Television episodes set in amusement parks
Treehouse of Horror